Andrew Byrd (born July 15, 1982) is an American politician who has served in the West Virginia House of Delegates from the 35th district since 2014.

In July 2020 he was elected second vice chairman of the West Virginia Democratic Party. The term is two years long.

References

1982 births
Living people
Democratic Party members of the West Virginia House of Delegates
21st-century American politicians
People from South Charleston, West Virginia